Perupalem Beach is located on the coast of Bay of Bengal, in West Godavari district of the Indian state of Andhra Pradesh. The beach is being developed for tourism by the state tourism board, APTDC.

See also 
List of beaches in India

References 

Beaches of Andhra Pradesh
Geography of West Godavari district
Tourist attractions in Palakollu